Myint Naing (born 13 November 1942) is a Burmese dental professor who served as Rector of the University of Dental Medicine, Yangon from 1995 to 1997. He was the third president of the Myanmar Dental Association (MDA) from 1996 to 1998.

Early life and education
Myint Naing was born in Rangoon, Myanmar on 13 November 1942. He graduated from University of Calcutta, Calcutta Medical College in July 1962. He received M.D.S. from Bombay in 1990.

See also
 Myanmar Dental Association
 Myanmar Dental Council
 University of Dental Medicine, Mandalay
 University of Dental Medicine, Yangon

References

Burmese dental professors
1942 births
Living people
University of Calcutta alumni
People from Yangon